Schlotheimia is a genus of extinct cephalopods belonging to the subclass Ammonoidea that lived during the Hettangian stage at the beginning of the Early Jurassic.

Description
The shell, or conch, of Schlotheimia rather evolute, coiled with all whorls exposed and only slightly embracing. The umbilicus is perforate as with more finely ribbed Angulaticeras. whorls are compressed, bearing ribs that cross the venter in chevrons, less developed  in Sulciferites

Distribution
Fossils of Schlotheimia species have been found in Lower Jurassic rocks of Argentina, Austria, Belgium, Canada, France, Germany, Indonesia, Italy, Luxembourg, Switzerland, United Kingdom, United States.

References

Further reading
 W. J. Arkell et al., 1957. Mesozoic Ammonoidea, Treatise on Invertebrate Paleontology, Part L, Mollusca 4. Geological Society of America and University of Kansas Press.

Schlotheimiidae
Ammonitida genera
Jurassic ammonites
Ammonites of Asia
Jurassic Asia
Jurassic ammonites of Europe
Jurassic Italy
Jurassic ammonites of North America
Jurassic Canada
Jurassic United States
Ammonites of South America
Jurassic Argentina